Kamal Ahmed Majumder (born 3 March 1950) is a Bangladesh Awami League politician and the incumbent Jatiya Sangsad member from Dhaka-15 since its inception in 2009.

Early life
Majumder graduated with a B.A. degree.

Career
Majumder contested the controversial by-election in Mirpur on 3 February 1993. He lost the election to Bangladesh Nationalist Party candidate Sayed Muhammad Mohsin. He was arrested in August 2002 by Bangladesh Police during the Bangladesh Nationalist Party government. Amnesty International feared that he would be tortured in custody.

Majumder was elected to Parliament in the 2008 Bangladeshi general election, beating Bangladesh Nationalist Party candidate Muhammad Hamidullah Khan. On 22 October 2013 his car was attacked with Molotov cocktails outside Mohona TV. He was elected to Parliament in the General Election 2014 as a candidate of Bangladesh Awami League from Dhaka-15. He beat his nearest rival Ekhlas Uddin Molla, an independent candidate by 26,786 votes. Majumder is the chairman of Mohona TV, a private television channel. He is a member of the Parliamentary standing committee on Housing and Public Works Ministry.

Personal life
Majumder is married to Shahida Majumdar. She is the daughter of Syed Yasin.Shahida was sued by Bangladesh Anti Corruption Commission for possession of illegal wealth. His son, Ziauddin Ahmed Majumder Jewel, was the managing director of Mohona TV. Jewel was sentenced to 40 years in jail in 2002 for the murder of Shipu, a cell phone trader in Banani. Jewel died on 29 May 2017.

Controversy
Majumder assaulted RTV journalist, Aparna Singha, and cameraman, Syed Haider, on 4 January 2012 in the Monipur High School and College at Mirpur. He is the president of the Monipur High School managing committee. He was fined in 2013 by Bangladesh Election Commission for violating the electoral code of conduct while campaigning for the 2014 Bangladesh general elections. In 2014 he established an extrajudicial court called Social Justice Committee in his office in Mirpur. Mirpur police officers described the court as illegal.

References

Living people
1950 births
Awami League politicians
9th Jatiya Sangsad members
10th Jatiya Sangsad members
11th Jatiya Sangsad members